5 in 1 is a ,  painted CorTen steel sculpture by Tony Rosenthal, installed at 1 Police Plaza in Lower Manhattan, New York. Commissioned by the government of New York City in 1971 at a cost of $80,000, it was created between 1973 and 1974, and installed on the brick paved pedestrian mall of 1 Police Plaza.

Rosenthal titled "5 in 1" as a metaphor for each of New York City's five boroughs: the Bronx, Brooklyn, Manhattan, Queens, and Staten Island. He created the  sculpture with five interlocking discs representing each of the boroughs.  Each of the five interlocking discs weighs . At the time of its installation in 1974, "5 in 1"  was the largest metal public art sculpture installed in New York City.

See also

 1974 in art
 Plop art

References

1974 establishments in New York City
1974 sculptures
Outdoor sculptures in Manhattan
Sculptures by Tony Rosenthal
Steel sculptures in New York City